Krigsseilerregisteret (English: The War Sailor Register, established on 19 January 2016) is a Norwegian website whose purpose is to create a register of all Norwegian sailors and ships that sailed in the period 1939 to 1945 for the neutral countries, for Nortraship, the Norwegian Domestic Fleet, the Royal Norwegian Navy, Allied and neutral merchant ships and in Allied navies. The website is still under preparation. The register/website is in Norwegian and English.

Arkivet Foundation is the owner and responsible for the War Sailor Register and the Norwegian Centre for War Sailor History and has collaborated with Lillesand Sjømannsforening. The register is funded by private contributors and received in 2016 a grant from the Norwegian state budget.

The register was opened in the presence of author Jon Michelet, who himself has been engaged in the theme, in January 2016.

See also
Norsk krigsseilermuseum

References

External links
 www.krigsseilerregisteret.no, English-language version
 Development of the register 
 Norwegian Centre for War Sailor History Arkivet 
 1929 - 1945 Norwegian Merchant Fleet

Norwegian websites
Norway in World War II